Psammodesmus is a genus of platyrhacid millipedes found from Panama to Peru. The 11 species constitute the platyrhacid subfamily Psammodesminae (formerly the tribe Psammodesmini).

Species
Psammodesmus atratus (Chamberlin, 1947)
Psammodesmus bryophorus Hoffman, Martínez & Flórez, 2011
Psammodesmus cainarachus (Chamberlin, 1941)
Psammodesmus calius (Chamberlin, 1952)
Psammodesmus camerani Silvestri, 1897
Psammodesmus chuncho (Chamberlin), 1941
Psammodesmus cos Cook, 1896
Psammodesmus dasys (Chamberlin, 1941)
Psammodesmus fasciolatus Silvestri, 1898
Psammodesmus remotus Loomis, 1964
Psammodesmus schmitti Loomis & Hoffman, 1953

References

Polydesmida
Millipedes of Central America
Millipedes of South America